Coso Junction (Timbisha: Coso, meaning "Fire Stone") is an unincorporated community in Inyo County, California. It is located in Rose Valley, 4.8 km (3 mi) south of Dunmovin and 11.2 km (7 mi) west of Sugarloaf Mountain, near to the US Navy's China Lake Weapons Station, at an elevation of 3386 feet (1032 m). The Coso Junction Chevron Fueling Station had a convenient Taco Bell franchise from 1988-2005. As of June 2022, the Chevron Station and Market is closed for remodeling, and the entire fuel station and market is being rebuilt.

History
The area has been inhabited by the Coso people traditionally.

The town has been previously called Coso and Gill's Oasis.

The community is the site of frequent earthquakes, with groups of minor earthquakes occurring in 1992, 1996, 1999, 2001, 2003, 2004, and 2011. Floods occurred near the community in 2010 that caused a traffic accident.

References

Unincorporated communities in California
Unincorporated communities in Inyo County, California